Royal Park is the largest of Melbourne's inner city parks.

Many sporting facilities are provided including the North Park Tennis Club, Royal Park Golf Course, football and soccer ovals, baseball and cricket pitches, State Netball & Hockey Centre, and cycling and walking paths. On the corner of Gatehouse Street and Royal Parade there is a native garden. There are wide vistas of grassland and lightly timbered areas with eucalypts, casuarina, and acacias. The Melbourne City Council administers the park and instituted in 1984 a park management plan. A wetlands area was developed in 2005.

The grassy hill between the Royal Children's Hospital and the Native Garden is ideal for kite flying during the day. Over the summer months, members of the Astronomical Society of Victoria set up telescopes and conduct evening talks and tours of the night sky from this vantage point.

Wildlife
The park is home to many native animals such as possums, and a rich variety of birdlife which includes: Pacific black duck, chestnut teal, white-faced heron, brown goshawk, collared sparrowhawk, Horsfield's bronze cuckoo, Australian hobby, galah, red-rumped parrot, eastern rosella, superb fairy-wren, white-plumed honeyeater, spotted pardalote, white-browed scrubwren, grey fantail and red-browed finch.

The park is home to a regionally significant population of White's skink (Egernia whitii) and a section of habitat is maintained specifically for this species.

History

In the early years of European settlement Wurundjeri campfires were sometimes seen in the vicinity of Royal Park, although the Yarra people generally preferred camping beside the Yarra River or Merri Creek.

In 1852, parts of this were sold to become part of the new suburbs of Carlton and North Melbourne. Also that year, some of the land become the Melbourne General Cemetery. 1853 saw part of the reserve become the home of the University of Melbourne.

In April 1858, 142 acres of the Park's north-western corner became an experimental farm. This site later become an orphanage, a homeless refuge, a nursing home, a geriatric rehabilitation facility, and finally a general rehabilitation hospital. It also became the home of CSL in 1919, a year after it was founded.

The reserve was further reduced to  when the rapid increase of population from the Victorian gold rush, led to creation of the suburb of Parkville.  A housing estate commenced sales in 1861 at what is now "Parkville South". In 1868 further excisions from Royal Park were made for housing estates at "Parkville North" along Royal Parade and "Parkville West" near Flemington Road. Parkville South was expanded in 1875.

In 1861 Melbourne Zoo was allocated . Further excisions followed for roads, Upfield railway line (1884), Melbourne Zoo horse tramline (1890), Royal Park psychiatric facility (1907), West Coburg electric tramline (1925), University High School (1929), Camp Pell (1942), Royal Melbourne Hospital (1944), Royal Children's Hospital (1957, and returned to parkland in 2013), Royal Dental Hospital (1963), Melbourne Sports Centre – Parkville (2001), and a relocated Royal Children's Hospital (2007).

In 1860 the Burke and Wills expedition set out from Royal Park to cross Australia from south to north. They perished on the return journey. A cairn now marks the departure point of their expedition in Royal Park.

The park was used for military encampments during World War One and Two, with Camp Pell being used by United States forces during the Second World War. After the war, the permanent buildings of Camp Pell were used for emergency housing accommodation until 1960. As of 2005, the one existing building from Camp Pell is used as an 'Urban Camp' to provide accommodation for rural school children and other groups when visiting Melbourne.

The Royal Park Master Plan Design Competition
Following many years of agitation by resident groups and various failed planning attempts, the Melbourne City Council held a design competition in 1984, judged by representatives of the Australian Institute of Landscape Architects, Royal Australian Institute of Parks and Recreation, Melbourne University's School of Environmental Planning, and the Melbourne City Council.

The winning entry by landscape architects Brian Stafford and Ronald Jones expressed a philosophy that the character of the Park was inherent in its form – 'a place where the earth swells, the dome of the sky soars overhead and the horizon beckons'. A sense of the landscape at the time of Europeans’ first encounter with it was to be evoked by planting indigenous species and enhancing the park's spacious quality, principally through a process of 'editing' rather than adding new features. The aim was 'to provide a park for persons rather than machinery, for individual public activity rather than restricted private institutions, and for psychological recreation as well as physical activity'.

The plan proposed extensive planting of indigenous trees, while the expansive hilltop in the park's south-east was to be cleared and planted with native grasses. A network of walking and cycle paths was proposed, along with works to reduce the impact of traffic and parking, including closing through roads, rebuilding a large section of Macarthur Road as a tunnel, and reorganising car parks.

The plan was greeted with consternation. Sporting groups were concerned with a potential loss of facilities; the Zoo administration wanted more parking rather than any attempt at control; there was concern for maintenance of motor routes; and The Age highlighted the intent to 'rip out' exotic trees. Council adopted the Master Plan – in principle and subject to various qualifications – after three years of debate.

The first works to implement the plan were completed in the early 1990s. Two new ovals were graded near Flemington Road to allow removal of the sports grounds, changing room and car park perched on the hilltop in the park's south-east, which now has uncluttered views of Melbourne's skyline. A new pond was formed, featuring rockwork by the landscape designer Gordon Ford.

A new layout for access and parking around the Zoo was finally agreed upon after a decade of negotiation between the Council and Zoo. Reorganization of the car parks, closure of various roads, development of forecourts to the zoo's main entry and extensive new plantings were completed in 1997.

A formal review of the Master Plan commenced in 1996. This included extensive public consultation that identified overwhelming support for the principles established by the winning entry in the 1984 Royal Park Master Plan Design Competition. The Master Plan as reviewed endorsed the objectives of the 1984 document and introduced proposals such as a major wetland water recycling project west of the railway line. It was approved by Council in November 1997.

Commonwealth Games Village
In 2003 the Labor Government of Steve Bracks selected the  former Royal Park Psychiatric Hospital site, bordering on Moonee Ponds Creek and in the neighbourhood of Royal Park (but not in the park), for the athletes village for the 2006 Commonwealth Games. After the games, the site developers, Australand and Citta Property Group, sold the housing. Opponents of the village criticised the building of the village citing the destruction of more than 1000 trees, demolition of 4 of the hospital buildings pending a heritage listing, and denigration of the heritage value of the remaining buildings, a lost opportunity to return a development back to public parkland, and privatisation of public lands.

Sporting groups criticised security arrangements for the athletes' village with large sections of the park and sporting grounds having security fencing erected for the exclusive use of athletes. This disrupted many community sporting associations from their regular use of sporting facilities.

Royal Children's Hospital extension
In 2005 the Bracks Labor Government selected an adjacent site in Royal Park to build a new Royal Children's Hospital. Sections of the old hospital were demolished and restored to parklands.

While the move attracted some opposition from green groups, it was promoted with the claim that there would be no net loss of parkland at Royal Park. The basis of area calculations used to support this claim is unclear. Relocation of the hospital's helipad onto the roof of the new building has removed this impact from the park, but after completion of construction, it appears that the hospital buildings now occupy a substantially larger area than previously, and parkland has been lost.

Sporting fields and facilities
 McAlister Oval
 Ransford Oval (Home of the Royal Park Brunswick Cricket Club)
 Western Oval
 Ryder Oval (Home of the Youlden Parkville Cricket Club since the 1940s)
 Brens Oval (Home of Parkville District Cricket Club)
 Walker East Oval
 Walker West Oval
 Ross Straw Field
 Poplar Oval
 Flemington Road Oval

Royal Park is also home to the State Netball & Hockey Centre, which hosts games in the top flight trans-Tasman netball competition and international hockey matches, Royal Park Golf Club - notable for being the place where one of Australian golfing's greatest champions, Peter Thomson, first learnt his craft - as well as several tennis clubs, and large areas of open space for less structured recreational activities.

Transport

Commuter Rail 
The Upfield railway line travels through Royal Park with Royal Park station being a convenient stop for the Melbourne Zoo.

Trams 
A light rail for trams runs through the park, which is served by route 58 to both West Coburg and Toorak.

The route 19 tram runs up Royal Parade, to the east of the park, which operates northbound to North Coburg, and southbound to Flinders Street station.

Two tram routes also run up Flemington Road, to the west of the park. The routes 57 and 59 operate in a northbound direction to West Maribyrnong and Airport West respectively. Both routes operate to Flinders Street station in a southbound direction.

Cyclists and pedestrians 
The Capital City Trail for cyclists follows the train line through Royal Park from the Moonee Ponds Creek Trail at Flemington Bridge, past Melbourne Zoo, and under Royal Parade along the converted Inner Circle railway line to Princes Park.

Gallery

References

External links
Melbourne City Council - Royal Park
Melbourne City Council - Royal Park Wetlands
Aerial Map of Royal Park
Camp Pell
Urban Camp for rural children
Royal Park Protection Group
North Park Tennis Club
Royal Park Golf Club
Royal Park Touch Association
Melbourne University RFC, Royal Park
Royal Park Brunswic Cricket Club, Royal Park

Parks in Melbourne
Landscape architecture
Urban public parks
City of Melbourne